Lai Man-wai (September 25, 1893 – October 26, 1953), also romanised as Lay Min-wei or M.W. Ray, considered the "Father of Hong Kong Cinema", was the director of the first Hong Kong film Zhuangzi Tests His Wife in 1913. In the film, Lai played the role of the wife, partly due to the reluctance of women to participate in show business at the time.

Biography

Born in Yokohama, Japan, of Xinhui, Guangdong origin and raised in Hong Kong, he joined Sun Yat-sen's Kuomintang party in 1911 and helped make anti-warlord movies. He was an active director during the golden years of the Shanghai movie industry from 1921 to 1928. In 1923, he founded the China Sun Motion Picture Company with his brother, Lai Pak-hoi, in Hong Kong which later relocated to Shanghai. In 1930, he co-founded one of the "Big Three" studios of the 1930s, Lianhua Film Company, with Lo Ming-yau. Lianhua, together with other leading Shanghai studios, was destroyed when the Empire of Japan attacked Shanghai in 1937. Lai returned to Hong Kong in 1938 and retired.

He was married to Lim Cho-cho, a Vancouver-born actress. His daughter Lai Suen and granddaughter Gigi Lai are both actresses.

Memory
His story was documented in Lai Man-wai: Father of Hong Kong Cinema by Choi Kai-kwong in 2001.

Lai Man-wai is portrayed in Stanley Kwan's 1991 biopic of actress Ruan Lingyu, Center Stage by Hong Kong actor, Waise Lee.

Partial filmography
 Zhuangzi Tests His Wife (1913)
 Romance of the Western Chamber (1927) directed with Hou Yao
 The Battle of Shanghai (1937)
 A Page of History (1941). Documentary. Lai Man-wai followed Sun Yat-sen during the 1920s.

References

Further reading

External links

 His Origins in Xinhui - http://www.southcn.com/news/gdnews/sh/hrjnh/fyrw/200409020627.htm

1893 births
1953 deaths
Chinese male silent film actors
Chinese film producers
Hong Kong film directors
Alumni of St. Paul's College, Hong Kong
Chinese silent film directors
Emigrants from Japan to British Hong Kong